In mathematics, the Chebyshev integral, named after Pafnuty Chebyshev, is

 

where  is an incomplete beta function.

References 

Gamma and related functions